|}

The Prix Alain du Breil is a Group 1 hurdle race in France which is open to four-year-old horses. It is run at Auteuil over a distance of 3,900 metres (about 2 miles and 3½ furlongs), and it is scheduled to take place each year in May or June.  It is the summer championship event for four year-old hurdlers, and is also known as Course de Haies d'Ete des Quatre Ans.

Winners

See also
 List of French jump horse races

References
France Galop / Racing Post:
, 

Horse races in France